Frat House is a 1998 documentary that explores the darker side of fraternity life.

The film is directed by Todd Phillips, director of The Hangover movie series, and Andrew Gurland, and was mostly filmed at the Alpha Tau Omega fraternity house at Muhlenberg College in Allentown, Pennsylvania. Alpha Tau Omega's charter was revoked two years later, in 2000, though it has since been reinstated.

The documentary also features scenes of the Beta Chi fraternity on the campus of SUNY Oneonta in Oneonta, New York. Beta Chi is an unrecognized fraternity in Oneonta and was kicked off the Oneonta campus after reports of severe hazing emerged. In January 2018, the fraternity was later recognized by SUNY Oneonta. Beta Chi was also recognized as chapter of the year in back to back years 2021 and 2022. Other unrecognized fraternities included in the documentary include Sigma Alpha Mu at SUNY Oneonta, also known as "Sammy", and Tau Kappa Epsilon, which was later recognized by the university in 2007 but subsequently had that recognition revoked.

Awards
Frat House was awarded "Grand Jury Prize: Documentary" at the 1998 Sundance Film Festival.

Criticisms
The documentary was criticized by Muhlenberg College for including scenes that it contends were staged, saying "This was promoted as a documentary. Clearly, it is fiction. The scenes were staged, and people were paid to act out scenes."

Responding to objections to the documentary by Alpha Tau Omega, HBO, the documentary's distributor, never aired it. But it was later released online.

References 
 Rapkin, Mickey. "Burning Down The House". The Cornell Daily Sun. October 15, 1998.
 Daly, Steve. "Hazed & Confused". Entertainment Weekly. Iss 466, pp. 19–20. January 8, 1999.

External links 
 
 "Are Those Two Fools At It Again?", Cahiers du Cinemart (article on the controversy)

1998 films
American documentary films
Films about fraternities and sororities
Muhlenberg College
1998 documentary films
Films shot in Pennsylvania
HBO documentary films
Films directed by Todd Phillips
Films produced by Todd Phillips
1990s American films